Benet is a commune in the Vendée department in the Pays de la Loire region in western France.

The former communes of Lesson, Sainte-Christine and Aziré were joined to the commune of Benet in 1973.

Geography
Close to Niort in Deux-Sèvres and Fontenay-le-Comte in Vendée, Benet is located near :

 South-Vendée
 Poitevin Marsh
 Atlantic Coast

The diversity of the landscapes, the limestone plain, along with the marshes of Sainte-Christine, Aziré and Nessier, make this commune a varied place, rich of its differences.

The Vrizon is the underground river that goes through the commune.

Benet is located close to the A83 and A10 motorways, connecting the commune to some major cities, as Nantes, Poitiers, Bordeaux, or Paris.

History
 Benet was formerly named Benet-les-Noyers.
 Former seat of a canton until 1801–1802, Benet has ultimately integrated the Canton of Maillezais.
 The communes of Lesson, Aziré and Sainte-Christine merged with the commune of Benet in 1973.

List of mayors

Demography

Monuments
The Sainte-Eulalie Church, on the historical register, constitutes an unmissable stage in the tour of the Romance Churches and Abbeys of the region.

A few kilometres away, it is possible to visit the historic site of the Maillezais Cathedral.

A total of ten wind turbines overhang the commune.

Notable people
 
 
Jean-Paul Ribreau (born 1957), former professional footballer

Twin towns
  Sundern, Germany

Events
 Each first Sunday of July, the "Fête du Préfou" is organized in the harbor of Aziré.
 In November, is organized the traditional "Foire aux alouettes" (Lark Fair).

See also
Communes of the Vendée department

References

External links

Website of the municipality of Benet

Communes of Vendée